The Fourth Affiliated Hospital of Xinjiang Medical University, also known as the Hospital of Chinese Medicine of the Xinjiang Uyghur Autonomous Region  (Chinese: 新疆维吾尔自治区中医医院) is a teaching hospital in Urumqi, Xinjiang, China affiliated with the College of Traditional Chinese Medicine of Xinjiang Medical University.  It has served Xinjiang Medical University students since 1959. It has 938 staff, among which there are 812 professionals and 48 technicians. The hospital has one branch and three out-patient departments at different places, including one rehabilitation center.

References

Xinjiang Medical University
Hospital buildings completed in 1960
Hospital XMU 4
Hospitals in Xinjiang
Hospitals established in 1959
1959 establishments in China